Tytocha is a genus of moths in the family Lasiocampidae. The genus was first described by Schaus in 1924.

Species
Tytocha crassilinea Dognin, 1923
Tytocha lineata Dognin, 1923

External links

Lasiocampidae